Jamestown High School is a public high school located in Jamestown, North Dakota. It is a part of the Jamestown Public Schools system. The school athletic teams are known as the Blue Jays.

Athletics

Championships

State Class 'A' boys' basketball: 1939, 1976, 1978, 1982, 1987, 1993, 2019
State Class 'A' girls' basketball: 1974
State Class 'A' football: 1933, 1937, 2021, 2022
State Class 'A' boys' track and field: 1953
State Class 'A' girls' volleyball: 2013
State Class 'A' boys' cross country: 1978 1997

Other activities
 Drama
 Speech
 Band
 Choir
 Vocal Jazz
 Show Choir
 Jazz Band
 Orchestra
 Science Olympiad
 DECA
 FBLA
 SkillsUSA
 VICA
 Blue Jay News
 Debate
 Yearbook
 German Club
 Spanish Club
 NHS
 SADD
FIRST Robotics Competition
 Key Club
 LifeSmarts

Notable alumni 
 Ronald Alan Schulz, civilian contract worker who was kidnapped and killed by the Islamic Army in Iraq
 Charles F. Thompson (1899), U.S. Army major general

References

External links
Jamestown High School

Public high schools in North Dakota
North Dakota High School Activities Association (Class A)
North Dakota High School Activities Association (Class AAA Football)
Schools in Stutsman County, North Dakota
Buildings and structures in Jamestown, North Dakota